Pullman was an unincorporated community in Potter County, located in the U.S. state of Texas. It is now within the city limits of Amarillo.

References

Unincorporated communities in Potter County, Texas
Unincorporated communities in Texas